Eastern Beach is a suburb of Auckland, New Zealand. Located on the eastern city of the city centre, the suburb is in the Howick ward, one of the thirteen administrative divisions of Auckland City.

Its most common attraction is a popular white-sand palm fringed beach, also called Eastern Beach, with summer temperatures attracting thousands of people from neighbouring suburbs to the beach to enjoy the shallow waters, and shops and parks within close vicinity. At the southern end of the beach is a boat ramp giving high-medium tide access to the dedicated water skiing zone adjacent to the beach. This was a popular area for gathering Pipi and Cockles, but overuse has seen a rāhui or ban placed on the beach. It is part of the Bucklands Beach peninsula.

Demographics

Eastern Beach had a population of 2,190 at the 2018 New Zealand census, an increase of 54 people (2.5%) since the 2013 census, and an increase of 9 people (0.4%) since the 2006 census. There were 765 households, comprising 1,050 males and 1,140 females, giving a sex ratio of 0.92 males per female. The median age was 45.0 years (compared with 37.4 years nationally), with 360 people (16.4%) aged under 15 years, 405 (18.5%) aged 15 to 29, 1,032 (47.1%) aged 30 to 64, and 390 (17.8%) aged 65 or older.

Ethnicities were 59.0% European/Pākehā, 3.8% Māori, 2.2% Pacific peoples, 37.9% Asian, and 2.6% other ethnicities. People may identify with more than one ethnicity.

The percentage of people born overseas was 48.5, compared with 27.1% nationally.

Although some people chose not to answer the census's question about religious affiliation, 49.9% had no religion, 35.6% were Christian, 0.3% had Māori religious beliefs, 2.2% were Hindu, 1.8% were Muslim, 3.0% were Buddhist and 2.9% had other religions.

Of those at least 15 years old, 594 (32.5%) people had a bachelor's or higher degree, and 189 (10.3%) people had no formal qualifications. The median income was $35,100, compared with $31,800 nationally. 429 people (23.4%) earned over $70,000 compared to 17.2% nationally. The employment status of those at least 15 was that 816 (44.6%) people were employed full-time, 261 (14.3%) were part-time, and 48 (2.6%) were unemployed.

References

External links
Macleans Tennis Club
Photographs of Eastern Beach held in Auckland Libraries' heritage collections.

Suburbs of Auckland
Beaches of the Auckland Region
Populated places around the Hauraki Gulf / Tīkapa Moana
Howick Local Board Area